is a railway station on the Hakodate Main Line in Otaru, Hokkaido, Japan, operated by Hokkaido Railway Company (JR Hokkaido). The station is numbered S16.

Lines
Shioya Station is served by the Hakodate Main Line.

Station layout
The station has two side platforms connected by an overpass. Kitaca is not available. The station is unattended.

Platforms

Adjacent stations

History
Shioya Station opened on 28 June 1903.

References

Railway stations in Otaru
Railway stations in Japan opened in 1903